Chlormayenite (after Mayen, Germany), Ca12Al14O32[☐4Cl2], is a rare calcium aluminium oxide mineral of cubic symmetry. 

It was originally reported from Eifel volcanic complex (Germany) in 1964. It is also found at pyrometamorphic sites such as in the Hatrurim Formation of Israel and in some burned coal dumps.

It occurs in thermally altered limestone xenoliths within basalts in Mayen, Germany and Klöch, Styria, Austria. In the Hatrurim of Israel it occurs in thermally altered limestones. It occurs with calcite, ettringite, wollastonite, larnite, brownmillerite, gehlenite, diopside, pyrrhotite, grossular, spinel, afwillite, jennite, portlandite, jasmundite, melilite, kalsilite and corundum in the limestone xenoliths. In the Hatrurim it occurs with spurrite, larnite, grossite and brownmillerite.

Synthetic Ca12Al14O33 and Ca12Al14O32(OH)2 are known, they are stabilized by moisture instead of chlorine. The formula can be written as [Ca12Al14O32]O, which refers to the unique feature: anion diffusion process.

Chlormayenite is also found as calcium aluminate in cement where its formula is also written as 11CaO·7 Al2O3·CaCl2, or C11A7CaCl2 in the cement chemist notation.

See also
 Calcium aluminate cements

References

Oxide minerals
Calcium minerals
Aluminium minerals
Cubic minerals
Minerals in space group 220
Cement
Concrete